The Philippine Institute for Development Studies (PIDS) is a government-owned and controlled corporation of the Philippine National Government. It was established in September 1977 to conduct research to help government planners. Its primary client is the National Economic and Development Authority. PIDS was established by Presidential Decree No. 1201.

History

About the Institute

Roles and Goals
To develop and implement a comprehensive and integrated research program that will provide the research materials and studies required for the formulation of national development plans and policies;
To serve as a common link between the government and existing research institutions;
To establish a repository for economic research information and other related activities.

Programs and Activities
To carry out its mandate, the Institute has maintained three basic programs, namely:
Research Program;
Outreach Program; and
Dissemination and Research Utilization Program.

The Policy Research Agenda for 2005-2009 include the following themes:
 Economic Policy Choices
 Policies for Sustainable Human Development
 Institutional Development and Good Governance

The Philippine Institute for Development Studies (PIDS) has developed various websites and online databases from socioeconomic indicators and agricultural statistics to economic-related bills.

Publications
Policy Notes:
The Policy Notes are observations/analyses written by PIDS researchers on certain policy issues.
Development Research News:
The Development Research News is a bimonthly publication of the Institute which highlights findings and recommendations culled from PIDS-sponsored research and fora. This newsletter also features special articles on key national and current issues as well as news on PIDS activities participated in by the staff.
Discussion Papers:
The Discussion Papers are preliminary, unedited and unreviewed papers circulated on a limited basis for the purpose of eliciting critical comments and suggestions for refinement of the studies. They may eventually graduate into any of the Institute's regular publication series. The Philippine APEC Study Center Network (PASCN) also publishes discussion papers on APEC-related matters.
Economic Issue of the Day:
The Economic Issue of the Day is a two-page publication which deals with concepts behind certain economic issues. This dissemination outlet aims to define and explain in simple and easy-to-understand terms basic economic concepts as they relate to current and everyday economics-related matters.
Philippine Journal of Development:
The Philippine Journal of Development, formerly Journal of Philippine Development, is a professional journal published twice a year which focuses on the various aspects of Philippine development particularly on economy, business, public administration, foreign relations, sociology, political dynamics and other topics which have strong policy implications on Philippine concerns.
Research Paper Series:
The Research Paper Series is a formal publication meant to promote research, stimulate discussion and encourage the use of study results.
PIDS Books

References

External links
Philippine Institute for Development Studies

Government-owned and controlled corporations of the Philippines
Development organizations
1977 establishments in the Philippines
Establishments by Philippine presidential decree